John Pauly may refer to:
 John Pauly (engineer), professor of engineering
 John W. Pauly (1923–2013), United States Air Force general
 John J. Pauly, academic administrator
 Jean Samuel Pauly (1766–c. 1821), Swiss inventor and gunsmith, also known as John Pauly